Cedar Cove may refer to:

Cedar Cove (Cazenovia, New York), historic house listed on the National Register of Historic Places
Cedar Cove (fictional community), setting of book series by author Debbie Macomber
Cedar Cove (TV series), a television series based on book series by Debbie Macomber
Cedar Cove Feline Conservatory & Sanctuary, an animal shelter